Titus (AD 39–81) was Roman emperor from 79 to 81.

Titus may also refer to:

Bible
 Epistle to Titus, a book of the Bible

People

Given name

Ancient Rome
 Titus (praenomen)
 Emperor Vespasian (AD 9–79), also named Titus Flavius Vespasianus, later Titus Flavius Caesar Vespasianus Augustus, father of Emperor Titus
Emperor Domitian (AD 51–96), Titus Flavius Domitianus, later Titus Flavius Caesar Domitianus and Titus Flavius Caesar Domitianus Augustus
 The historian Titus Livius (59 BC–AD 17), usually referred to as Livy in English
 Titus Pomponius Atticus (110/109 BC–35/32 BC), philosopher and friend of Marcus Tullius Cicero
 Titus Quinctius Flamininus (c. 229 BC–174 BC), politician and general instrumental in the Roman conquest of Greece
 Titus Labienus (c. 100 BC–45 BC), Roman general
 Titus Tatius (died 748 BC), according to tradition the Sabine king who attacked Rome but reconciled with the Roman king Romulus
 Titus (usurper), one of the Thirty Tyrants in the Historia Augusta
 Titus Aurelius Fulvus T.f. T.n Antoninus Pius, Roman emperor from 138 to 161.
 Titus Pullo, centurion in Caesar's legions
 Titus Tarquinius, son of the last king of Rome

Early Christians
 Saint Titus (died 96 or 107), fellow worker with St. Paul of Tarsus and pastor of the first Christian church in Crete at Gortyn
 Titus of Byzantium, Patriarch of Constantinople (242–272)
 Titus of Bostra (died c. 378), Christian theologian and bishop
 Titus, another name for Saint Dismas in Arabic Christian tradition

Other
 Titus Bramble (born 1981), English footballer
 (Blessed) Titus Brandsma (1881–1942), outspoken Dutch Catholic opponent of Nazism
 Titus Corlățean (born 1968),  Romanian politician and diplomat
 Titus Davis, American football player
 Titus Kaphar, American painter
 Titus Lewis (1773–1811), Welsh Calvinist and writer
 Titus Munteanu (1941–2013), Romanian filmmaker
 Titus Oates (1649–1705), English perjurer who fabricated the "Popish Plot"
 Titus van Rijn (1641–1668), son of the Dutch painter Rembrandt
 Sir Titus Salt (1803–1876), manufacturer, politician and philanthropist in West Yorkshire, creator of alpaca cloth
 Titus Thotawatte (1927–2011), Sri Lankan director and editor
 Titus Welliver (born 1961), American actor
 (Blessed) Titus Zeman (1915–1969), Slovak Salesian and Catholic priest, prosecuted by the communist regime

Surname 
 Alan Titus (born 1945), American baritone
 Christopher Titus (born 1964), comedian actor of the sitcom Titus
 Cliff Titus, (1890–1988), American politician, Missouri state senator
 Craig Titus (born 1965), American former professional bodybuilder and convicted murderer
 Dina Titus (born 1950), American politician
 Eve Titus (1922–2002), children's writer
 Herb Titus (born 1937), Constitution Party vice-presidential candidate in the 1996 US election
 Jack Titus (1908–1978), Australian rules footballer
 Mark Titus (born 1987), Ohio State University basketball player and blogger
 Robert Titus (c. 1600–c. 1670), English Puritan, New England settler
 Robert C. Titus (1839–1918), New York politician
 Robin L. Titus (born 1954), member of the Nevada Assembly
 Roger W. Titus (1941–2019), United States District Court judge
 Silas Titus (1811–1899), American Civil War soldier and active organizer of the city of Syracuse, New York
 Silas Wright Titus (1849–1922), engineer and inventor of water pumping systems, discoverer of water supplies for New York City
 Silius Titus (1623–1704), captain of Deal Castle, and Gentleman of the Bedchamber to King Charles II
 Theo Titus (1920–2008), American politician, writers, journalist, and businessman
 William A. Titus (1868–1951), American businessman and politician

Nickname 

 Titus Oates, nickname of British Antarctic explorer and army officer Lawrence Oates (1880–1912)

Ring name 
 Titus, former ring name of professional wrestler Ryan Wilson
 Titus O'Neil, ring name of professional wrestler Thaddeus Bullard

Places 
 Titus, the ancient name of the Krka River in Croatia
 Titus, Indiana, an unincorporated community in the United States
 Titus County, Texas, United States

Animals 
 Titus (gorilla)
 Titus (spider), a genus of spiders
 Titus, a specimen of Tyrannosaurus

Arts, entertainment, and media

Fictional characters
 Titus (comics), a white tiger alien appearing in Marvel Comics media
 Titus, Lexa's top counsel in the TV series The 100
 Titus, the titular character of the video game Titus the Fox
 Titus, the playable character in the video game Warhammer 40,000: Space Marine
 Titus Andromedon, a character in the Netflix comedy series Unbreakable Kimmy Schmidt
 Titus Andronicus (character), the protagonist of William Shakespeare's play, Titus Andronicus
 Titus Faversham, in the radio comedy series The Penny Dreadfuls Present...
 Titus Fitch, a central character in The Sea, the Sea by Iris Murdoch
 Titus Groan, the protagonist in the Gormenghast books by Mervyn Peake
 Titus Pullo (Rome character), a Roman centurion in the HBO TV series Rome
 Titus Strega-Borgia, a character in the Pure Dead series by Debi Gliori
 Titus, a cannibalistic past tribute from District 6 in The Hunger Games
 Komutan Titus, a Templar commander and antagonist in the Turkish TV series Diriliş: Ertuğrul

Works
 Titus (film) (1999), a film based upon Shakespeare's play
 Titus (soundtrack) of the 1999 film
 Titus (TV series), American situation comedy based on Christopher Titus

Brands and enterprises
 Titus books (publisher), in New Zealand
 Titus Software, a defunct video game company

Other uses
 TITUS (project), for creation of an Indo-European languages thesaurus

 TITUS Cyberbit Basic, a typeface
 , a fishing vessel that served during World War II as a minesweeper
 Nexter Titus, a French Infantry mobility vehicle

See also
Tidus, protagonist of Final Fantasy X
Titas (disambiguation)
Tito (disambiguation)
Senator Titus (disambiguation)
 Tituss Burgess, actor

Romanian masculine given names